Kurland (often referred to as Kurland Village) is a rural township in the Garden Route District Municipality in the Western Cape province of South Africa.

Located in the Crags area on the edge of the Tsitsikamma Nature Reserve, 20 km from Plettenberg Bay, it is affected by high levels of unemployment and domestic violence. Tourist attractions in the area include Birds of Eden, Tenikwa, Monkeyland Primate Sanctuary and Elephant Sanctuary along with guest houses and B&Bs. These places provide a vast number of job opportunities to the locals. The Crags Primary School, built in 1981, is the only school in the village.

References 

Populated places in the Bitou Local Municipality
Townships in the Western Cape
Former Coloured townships in South Africa